Thomas Dannett (1543–1601) was an English politician.

He was a Member (MP) of the Parliament of England for Maidstone in 1572.

References

1543 births
1601 deaths
English MPs 1572–1583